The phoenix is an immortal bird associated with Greek mythology (with analogs in many cultures) that cyclically regenerates or is otherwise born again. Associated with the sun, a phoenix obtains new life by rising from the ashes of its predecessor. Some legends say it dies in a show of flames and combustion, others that it simply dies and decomposes before being born again. In the Motif-Index of Folk-Literature, a tool used by folklorists, the phoenix is classified as motif B32.

The origin of the phoenix has been attributed to Ancient Egypt by Herodotus and later 19th-century scholars, but other scholars think the Egyptian texts may have been influenced by classical folklore. Over time the phoenix motif spread and gained a variety of new associations; Herodotus, Lucan, Pliny the Elder, Pope Clement I, Lactantius, Ovid, and Isidore of Seville are among those who have contributed to the retelling and transmission of the phoenix motif. Over time, extending beyond its origins, the phoenix could variously "symbolize renewal in general as well as the sun, time, the Empire, metempsychosis, consecration, resurrection, life in the heavenly Paradise, Christ, Mary, virginity, the exceptional man, and certain aspects of Christian life". Some scholars have claimed that the poem De ave phoenice may present the mythological phoenix motif as a symbol of Christ's resurrection.

Etymology
The modern English word phoenix entered the English language from Latin, later reinforced by French. The word first entered the English language by way of a borrowing of Latin phoenīx into Old English (fenix). This borrowing was later reinforced by French influence, which had also borrowed the Latin noun. In time, the word developed specialized use in the English language: For example, the term could refer to an "excellent person" (12th century), a variety of heraldic emblem (15th century), and the name of a constellation (17th century).

The Latin word comes from Greek  phoinīx. The Greek word is first attested in the Mycenaean Greek po-ni-ke, which probably meant 'griffin', though it might have meant 'palm tree'. That word is probably a borrowing from a West Semitic word for madder, a red dye made from Rubia tinctorum. The word Phoenician appears to be from the same root, meaning 'those who work with red dyes'. So phoenix may mean 'the Phoenician bird' or 'the purplish-red bird'.

Early texts
Exterior to the Linear B mention above from Mycenaean Greece, the earliest clear mention of the phoenix in ancient Greek literature occurs in a fragment of the Precepts of Chiron, attributed to 8th-century BC Greek poet Hesiod. In the fragment, the wise centaur Chiron tells a young hero Achilles the following, describing the phoenix's lifetime as 972 times the length of a long-lived human's:

Disputed origins
Classical discourse on the subject of the phoenix attributes a potential origin of the phoenix to Ancient Egypt. Herodotus, writing in the 5th century BC, provides the following account of the phoenix:

In the 19th century, scholastic suspicions appeared to be confirmed by the discovery that Egyptians in Heliopolis had venerated the Bennu, a solar bird similar in some respects to the Greek phoenix. However, the Egyptian sources regarding the bennu are often problematic and open to a variety of interpretations. Some of these sources may have actually been influenced by Greek notions of the phoenix, rather than the other way around.

Depictions

The phoenix is sometimes pictured in ancient and medieval literature and medieval art as endowed with a halo, which emphasizes the bird's connection with the Sun. In the oldest images of phoenixes on record these nimbuses often have seven rays, like Helios (the Greek personification of the Sun). Pliny the Elder also describes the bird as having a crest of feathers on its head, and Ezekiel the Dramatist compared it to a rooster.

The phoenix came to be associated with specific colors over time. Although the phoenix was generally believed to be colorful and vibrant, sources provide no clear consensus about its coloration. Tacitus says that its color made it stand out from all other birds. Some said that the bird had peacock-like coloring, and Herodotus's claim of the Phoenix being red and yellow is popular in many versions of the story on record. Ezekiel the Tragedian declared that the phoenix had red legs and striking yellow eyes, but Lactantius said that its eyes were blue like sapphires and that its legs were covered in yellow-gold scales with rose-colored talons.

Herodotus, Pliny, Solinus, and Philostratus describe the phoenix as similar in size to an eagle, but Lactantius and Ezekiel the Dramatist both claim that the phoenix was larger, with Lactantius declaring that it was even larger than an ostrich.

According to Pliny's Natural History,

According to Claudian's poem "The Phoenix",

Appearances 
According to Pliny the Elder, a senator Manilius (Marcus Manilius ?) had written that the phoenix appeared at the end of each Great Year, which he took to have occurred "in the consulship of Gnaeus Cornelius and Publius Licinius", that is, in 96 BC. Another of Pliny's sources, Cornelius Valerianus, is cited for an appearance of the phoenix in 36 AD "in the consulship of Quintus Plautius and Sextus Papinius". Pliny states that a purported phoenix seen in Egypt in 47 AD was brought to the capital and exhibited in the Comitium in time for the 800th anniversary of the foundation of Rome by Romulus, though he added that "nobody would doubt that this phoenix was a fabrication".

Diffusion in later culture
In time, the motif and concept of the phoenix extended from its origins in ancient Greek folklore. For example, the classical motif of the phoenix continues into the Gnostic manuscript On the Origin of the World from the Nag Hammadi Library collection in Egypt generally dated to the 4th century:

The anonymous 10th century Old English Exeter Book contains an anonymous 677-line 9th-century alliterative poem consisting of a paraphrase and abbreviation of Lactantius, followed by an explication of the Phoenix as an allegory for the resurrection of Christ.

In the 14th century, Italian poet Dante Alighieri refers to the phoenix in Inferno Canto XXIV:

In the 17th-century play Henry VIII by English playwrights William Shakespeare and John Fletcher, Archbishop Cranmer says in Act V, Scene v in reference to Elizabeth (who was to become Queen Elizabeth I):

In the 19th-century novel Sartor Resartus by Thomas Carlyle, Diogenes Teufelsdröckh remarks on the "burning of a World-Phoenix" and the "Palingenesia, or Newbirth of Society" from its ashes:

Phoenixes are present and relatively common in European heraldry, which developed during the High Middle Ages. They most often appear as crests, and more rarely as charges. The heraldic phoenix is depicted as the head, chest and wings of an eagle rising from a fire; the entire creature is never depicted.

Analogues
Scholars have observed analogues to the phoenix in a variety of cultures. These analogues include the Hindu garuda (गरुड) and bherunda (भेरुण्ड), the Russian firebird (жар-птица), the Persian simorgh (سیمرغ), the Georgian paskunji, the Arabian anqa (عنقاء), the Turkish Konrul, also called Zümrüdü Anka ("emerald anqa"), the Tibetan Me byi karmo, the Chinese Fenghuang (鳳凰) and Zhuque (朱雀), and the Japanese Hō-ō (鳳凰). These perceived analogues are sometimes included as part of the Motif-Index of Folk-Literature phoenix motif (B32).

See also
 Firebird
 Chalkydri
 Chol (Bible), a Hebrew word sometimes glossed as phoenix
 List of phoenixes in popular culture

Notes

References
 .
 .
 Evelyn-White, Hugh G. Trans. 1920. Hesiod: The Homeric Hymns and Homerica. London: William Heinemann & New York: G.P. Putnam's Sons.
 .
Thompson, Stith (2001). Motif-Index of Folk-Literature: A Classification of Narrative Elements in Folk Tales, Ballads, Myths, Fables, Mediaeval Romances, Exempla, Fabliaux, Jest-Books, and Local Legends, Volume 1; Volume 6. Indiana University Press. 
 .

Greek legendary creatures
Heraldic beasts
Immortality
Legendary birds
Masonic symbolism
National symbols of Greece